The Type UB I submarine (sometimes known as the UB-1 class) was a class of small coastal submarines (U-boats) built in Germany at the beginning of the First World War. 20 boats were constructed, most of which went into service with the German Imperial Navy. Boats of this design were also operated by the Austro-Hungarian Navy (Kaiserliche und Königliche Kriegsmarine or K.u.K. Kriegsmarine) and the Bulgarian Navy.

Built to meet the need for small maneuverable submarines able to operate in the narrow, shallow seas off Flanders, the vessels were intended to be quickly constructed, then shipped by rail and assembled at their port of operation. The design effort began in mid-August 1914 and by mid-October the first 15 boats were ordered from two German shipyards. The German Imperial Navy subsequently ordered an additional pair of boats to replace two sold to Austria-Hungary, who ordered a further three boats in April 1915.

A total of 20 UB Is were built. Construction of the first boats for Germany began in early November 1914; all 20 were completed by October 1915. Several of the first boats underwent trials in German home waters, but the rest were assembled and tested at either Antwerp or Pola. The German boats operated primarily in the Flanders, Baltic, and Constantinople Flotillas. All had two bow torpedo tubes and two torpedoes, and were equipped with a deck-mounted machine gun.

In 1918 four of the surviving German boats were converted into coastal minelayers. Of the seventeen boats in German service, two were sold to Austria-Hungary, one was sold to Bulgaria, and nine were lost during the war. One of the five Austro-Hungarian boats was sunk and another mined and not repaired. The five surviving German boats, the four surviving Austro-Hungarian boats, and the Bulgarian boat were all turned over to the Allies after the end of the war and were broken up.

Design 
In the earliest stages of the First World War the German Army's rapid advance along the North Sea coast found the German Imperial Navy without submarines suitable to operate in the narrow and shallow seas off Flanders. By 18 August 1914, two weeks after the German invasion of Belgium, the planning of a series of small coastal submarines had already begun.

The rushed planning effort—which had been assigned the name "Project 34"—resulted in the Type UB I design, created specifically for operation from Flanders.

Boats of the Type UB I design were built by two manufacturers, Germaniawerft of Kiel and AG Weser of Bremen, which led to some variations in boats from the two shipyards. The eight Germaniawerft-built boats were slightly longer at  length overall, while the twelve Weser-built boats came in  shorter than their counterparts. The boats all displaced  while surfaced, but differed slightly in displacement submerged. The slightly longer Germaniawerft boats displaced  while submerged, as they weighed  more than the Weser boats.

The drivetrain of the boats consisted of a single propeller shaft driven by a Daimler (Germaniawerft) or Körting (Weser) diesel engine on the surface, or a Siemens-Schuckert electric motor for underwater travel. The Germaniawerft boats were about  slower than their Bremen-made counterparts. The boats were equipped with two  bow torpedo tubes and carried two torpedoes. They were also armed with a single  machine gun affixed to the deck. None of the Type UB I boats had a deck gun.

Construction 
The German Imperial Navy ordered its first fifteen Type UB I boats on 15 October 1914. Eight boats—numbered UB-1 to UB-8—were ordered from Germaniawerft of Kiel, and seven boats—numbered UB-9 to U-15—from AG Weser of Bremen. After two of the class, UB-1 and UB-15, were sold in February 1915 to ally Austria-Hungary (becoming U-10 and U-11 in the Austro-Hungarian Navy), the German Imperial Navy ordered UB-16 and UB-17 from Weser. A further three for Austria-Hungary —U-15, U-16, and U-17—had been ordered from Weser by April, bringing the total number constructed to 20.

UB-1 and UB-2 were laid down on 1 November 1914 at the Germaniawerft yard at Kiel. UB-1 was launched on 22 January 1915, just 75 working days later. UB-2s launch followed on 13 February. Among the Weser boats, UB-9 was laid down first, on 6 November 1914, and launched on 6 February 1915, a week ahead of UB-2. These first three boats launched underwent trials in home waters, but most of the other members of the class were shipped via rail and underwent trials at their assembly point.

The process of shipping the submarines by rail involved breaking the submarines down into what was essentially a knock down kit. Each boat was broken into approximately fifteen pieces and loaded onto eight railway flatcars. Type UB I boats destined for service with the Flanders Flotilla  made a five-day journey to Antwerp for the two- to three-week assembly process. After assembly at Antwerp the boats were towed by barge to Bruges for trials. Boats selected for service in the Mediterranean were sent to the Austro-Hungarian port of Pola for assembly. The total time from departure of the railcars from the shipyard to operational readiness for the boats was about six weeks.

By July 1915 all seventeen of the German Imperial Navy Type UB Is had been completed.

History
During their trials the Type UB Is were found to be too small and too slow and had a reputation for being underpowered; one commander compared his Type UB I to a "sewing machine". According to authors R. H. Gibson and Maurice Prendergast in their 1931 book The German Submarine War, 1914–1918, the UBs did not have enough power to chase down steamers while surfaced and lacked the endurance to spend any extended amount of time underwater, exhausting their batteries after little over an hour's running. In-service use revealed another problem: with a single propeller shaft/engine combination, if either component failed, the U-boat was almost totally disabled.

Another reported problem with the Type UB Is was the tendency to break trim after the firing of torpedoes. The boats were equipped with compensating tanks designed to flood and offset the loss of the C/06 torpedo's  weight, but this system did not always function properly; as a result, when firing from periscope depth the boat could broach after firing or, if too much weight was taken on, plunge to the depths. When UB-15 torpedoed and sank  in June 1915, the tank failed to properly compensate, forcing the entire crew to run to the stern to offset the trim imbalance.

Despite the problems, the "tin tadpoles", as the Germans referred to them, were in active service from March 1915 through the end of the war, with half of the 20 boats lost during the war. Boats of the class served in three navies: the German Imperial Navy, the Austro-Hungarian Navy, and the Bulgarian Navy. In German service, they served primarily in the Flanders Flotilla, the Baltic Flotilla, and the Constantinople Flotilla.

German Imperial Navy

Flanders Flotilla 
The first Type UB I to enter service was UB-10, which formed the nucleus of the Flanders Flotilla, on 27 March 1915. By the end of April five more Type UB I boats had become operational. UB-10 was eventually joined in the Flanders Flotilla by UB-2, UB-4, UB-5, UB-6, UB-12, UB-13, UB-16, and UB-17; of these, only UB-2 made the journey to Flanders by sea rather than rail.

UB-4 departed on the first patrol from Flanders on 9 April, and was responsible for sinking the first ship sent down by the flotilla. The Type UB I boats of the Flanders Flotilla originally patrolled the area between the United Kingdom and the Netherlands, but began patrolling the English Channel after UB-6 pioneered a route past British antisubmarine nets and mines in the Straits of Dover in late June.

Over the Type UB Is' first year of service, UB-4 and UB-13 were both lost, and UB-2 and UB-5 were transferred to the Baltic Flotilla. In March 1917, UB-6 ran aground in Dutch waters and was interned for the rest of the war, along with her crew. The four remaining Type UB Is in Flanders—UB-10, UB-12, UB-16, UB-17—were all converted to minelayers by 1918, having their torpedo tubes removed and replaced with chutes to carry up to eight mines. All but UB-10 were lost in 1918; UB-10, in poor repair and out of service, was scuttled in October 1918 when the Germans evacuated from Flanders.

Baltic Flotilla 
UB-9 was initially assigned to the Baltic Flotilla, and was joined by UB-2 and UB-5 in early 1916. All three became training boats at Kiel in 1916, joining UB-11 in that duty. Little information is available about the Type UB I boats operating in the Baltic.

Constantinople Flotilla 

Four of the German Imperial Navy boats—UB-3, UB-7, UB-8, and UB-14—were selected for service with the Constantinople Flotilla.  All were sent to Pola for assembly and trials there as part of the Pola Flotilla before sailing on to join the Constantinople Flotilla. UB-3 disappeared en route to Constantinople in May 1915, but the other three arrived there by mid-June.

The three Type UB I boats of the Constantinople Flotilla seem to have patrolled primarily in the Black Sea. UB-8 was transferred to the Bulgarian Navy in May 1916, and UB-7 disappeared in the Black Sea in October 1916, leaving UB-14 as the sole remaining German Type UB I in the flotilla; she was surrendered at Sevastopol in November 1918 to French armies stationed there during the Russian Civil War.

Austro-Hungarian Navy 

UB-1 and the still incomplete UB-15 were sold to the Austria-Hungary in February 1915; both were dismantled and shipped to Pola in May. After one cruise under the German flag, each boat was commissioned into the Austro-Hungarian Navy. The pair—renamed U-10 and U-11, respectively—were joined by U-15, U-16, and U-17 in October. Known as the U-10 or the Okarina class as a part of the Austro-Hungarian Navy, the five boats operated primarily in the Adriatic in patrols off Italy and Albania. U-10 (ex UB-1) hit a mine in July 1918 and was beached, but had not been repaired by the end of the war. U-16 was sunk after she torpedoed an Italian destroyer in October 1916, and the remaining three (and the unrepaired U-10) were ceded to Italy at the end of the war.

Bulgarian Navy 

After UB-8 was transferred to the Bulgarian Navy in May 1916, she was renamed Podvodnik No. 18 (in Cyrillic: Подводник No. 18). She was Bulgaria's first submarine, and was engaged primarily in coastal defense duties off Bulgaria's main Black Sea port of Varna. Podvodnik No. 18 survived the war and was ceded to France after the Treaty of Neuilly-sur-Seine.

List of Type UB I submarines 
A total of 20 Type UB I submarines were built, 17 for the German Imperial Navy and three for the Austro-Hungarian Navy. Two of the German submarines—UB-1 and UB-15—were sold to Austria-Hungary and commissioned into the Austro-Hungarian Navy as U-10 and U-11, respectively. Those two and a further three built by AG Weser comprised the virtually identical U-10 class for the Austro-Hungarian Navy. Another of the German submarines, UB-8, was sold to Bulgaria in May 1916, becoming Podvodnik No. 18.

German Imperial Navy 
  (became the Austro-Hungarian U-10, July 1915)
 
 
 
 
 
 
  (became the Bulgarian Podvodnik No. 18, May 1916)
 
 
 
 
 
 
  (became the Austro-Hungarian U-11, June 1915)

Austro-Hungarian Navy 

In the Austro-Hungarian Navy the Type UB I boats were known as the U-10 class, which consisted of two former German Type UB I boats and three built specifically for Austria-Hungary.

  (the former German UB-1)
  (the former German UB-15)
 
 
 

In addition, four of the German Type UB Is assigned to the Pola Flotilla based at the Austro-Hungarian Navy's main naval base at Pola were assigned Austro-Hungarian designations.

  (as U-9)
  (as U-7)
  (as U-8)
  (as U-26)

These four boats remained under commission in the German Imperial Navy, retained German crews and commanders, and received orders from the German flotilla commander at Pola.

Bulgarian Navy 
Two crews of Bulgarian sailors were sent to Kiel for training. Before the purchase could be completed, UB-7 was sunk, leaving only one boat for Bulgaria. On 25 May 1916, UB-8 was officially transferred to Bulgaria for the remainder of the war.

 Podvodnik No. 18 (the former German UB-8)

Service records

Key

Notes

Footnotes

Citations

References 

 

 
 
 
 
 
 
 
 
 
 

 
 
 

 01
Type UB I
Type UB I
1914 introductions
1914 in Germany